O Outro Lado da Porta (Portuguese for The Other Side ff the Door) is the first DVD by Brazilian emo band Fresno, released on July 23, 2009. The DVD was recorded on March 11, 2009 at studio Midas in São Paulo.

Background and concept
In 2009, the band spells out the dream of launching a DVD. "O Outro Lado Da Porta" brings the band's history told by its own members, interviews, videos and a performance studio with 15 songs.

Track listing
Redenção
Passado
Quebre as Correntes
Pólo
Duas Lágrimas
Uma Música
Desde Quando Você Se Foi
Alguém Que Te Faz Sorrir
O Gelo
Onde Está
Stonehenge
Impossibilidades
Absolutamente Nada
Europa
Milonga

References

External links
 "Fresno commands rock festival in Sao Caetano do Sul" - R7
 "Fresno - The Other Side of the Door" - Drop Music
 "The Feast of Fresno" - Gazeta Do Povo
 "Fresno live on MIX" - O Povo
 "Fresno: a successful band, a story of friendship" - Contigo!
 "With gold in the luggage, Fresno launches DVD and runs the label 'emo'" - Globo
 "Lucas at the double" - Pioneiro
 "Fresno launches DVD disc and promises new for November" - Abril

Fresno (band) video albums
2009 video albums
2009 compilation albums
Music video compilation albums